Alexa Noel (born September 6, 2002) is an American tennis player.

Career
She has reached a career-high ITF world ranking of No. 4 and a singles ranking by the Women's Tennis Association (WTA) of 794 and a career-high WTA doubles ranking of 948.

Noel made it into the final of the 2019 Wimbledon girl's championship, before falling to Daria Snigur. On August 11, 2019, Noel and her partner, Abigail Forbes won the USTA Girls 18s National Championships doubles title, earning the pair a wild-card entry into the doubles main draw of the 2019 US Open. She won her first professional tournament on January 26, 2020, at the ITF Cancún.

ITF Circuit finals

Singles: 1 (title)

Junior Grand Slam tournament finals

Singles: 1 (runner-up)

References

External links
 
 

American female tennis players
2002 births
Living people
Tennis players from Scottsdale, Arizona
Sportspeople from Summit, New Jersey
Tennis people from New Jersey
Tennis players at the 2018 Summer Youth Olympics
21st-century American women
Iowa Hawkeyes women's tennis players